Dreamweb is an MS-DOS and Amiga point-and-click cyberpunk top-down adventure game released in 1994, developed by Creative Reality and published by Empire Interactive Entertainment. The game features mature themes and a dark plot filled with violence and brief full frontal nudity; a rarity for games at the time.

Dreamweb was re-released as freeware in October 2012.

Overview
The opening credits are reminiscent of Ridley Scott's Blade Runner. In addition to a similar typeface, the credits are displayed in white on black, with a loud metallic noise followed by a fade out, and the title appears in red on black. Much of the look and feel of the game is reminiscent of Blade Runner, while also drawing influence from the cyberpunk genre.

Dreamweb'''s musical score, composed by Matthew Seldon, is highly regarded, contributing to the atmosphere which made the game admired by many at the time; the DOS-only CD version had an extra audio track. The dark story also received praise. The original game included a booklet entitled Diary of a (Mad?) man, written by Stephen Marley, which has a far more layered and atmospheric 'prequel' story than the one in the game itself. The diary also supplies more background info on main character Ryan (and served as a copy-protection method).

The game was criticized for its poor top-down view and overlooking many conventions commonly observed in adventure games; for instance, while the player can examine and pick up most objects on-screen, the majority of them serve no purpose other than to take up inventory space.  The inability to control the course of conversations was also seen as a flaw.

Some puzzles, although logical, are very simplistic - while in many adventure games of the time (even more adult adventures) the solution to bypassing an NPC generally involved giving them an object, Dreamweb puts an emphasis on gunplay and the killing of several characters, sometimes with gory results. It was also one of the first mainstream games to feature an uncensored sex scene, which was quite controversial at the time of release.Dreamweb had two releases on the Amiga. The AGA version had 256 color graphics and an extra song over the standard version.  A PC version was released, first on disk format.  The Amiga version features a moody electronic soundtrack; the PC version is similar in style, although some of the compositions are different. The music is primarily short, looping, streaming sound files, with the PC version's being more advanced, although they suffer from low-fi encoding. A CD version was also released for the PC, which included full voice acting.

Story
The protagonist and anti-hero is Ryan, a bartender in a futuristic dystopian city (implied to be in England, as evidenced by the use of British English terms such as "lift" and "bonnet") who has been plagued by strange dreams of an entity known as the Dreamweb. In the dream that opens the game, Ryan is asked by the master monk of the Keepers to be the deliverer and kill the seven evils, who are united to break the Dreamweb and send mankind spiraling into chaos. In Diary of a (Mad?) man, however, which precedes the start of the game, it is strongly implied that Ryan is descending into psychosis and has fabricated the whole Dreamweb scenario in his mind.

After Ryan leaves his girlfriend Eden's house for work, he learns that due to frequent lateness his boss has decided to fire him. After hearing Ryan's explanation, however, he decides to give him a two-week, fully paid vacation to recover. On the bar's TV, Ryan learns the name and location of the first evil: David Crane, a rock star who is housed in a hotel for a gig later that night. He visits his housebound friend Louis, who directs him to a place where a gun can be purchased. After doing so, he registers himself at the same hotel, and after managing to get himself up to the penthouse, killing two bodyguards in the process, he finds Crane in bed with a woman. The woman hides under the bed and, after Crane begs for mercy, Ryan kills him and is teleported to the Dreamweb where he learns of the second evil, a general. He returns home, and while checking the news (where he finds the report of Crane's death), he learns General Sterling is the guest of a talk show being filmed at a TV station.

He leaves for the heavily guarded building, and finds a weak spot in the security. He shoots a guard, enters the building and gets access to the rafters of the studio. After replacing a burned-out fuse, he manoeuvres a huge box over Sterling's head and drops it, thereby crushing the general to death, but also causing a ratings peak for the channel.  Ryan is transported again to the Dreamweb, where he learns the third target is very close to one of his friends, none other than Eden's boss, Sartain. He collects information from Eden's work gear while she is bathing, and leaves for the company headquarters.

Ryan destroys a security console to get access to the upper floors, but as soon as he enters, he is greeted by two guards and a fleeing Sartain. He kills both guards with the help of a gem obtained in the Dreamweb, and in reading the contents of a briefcase grasped by the charred remains of a guard's arm, Ryan learns the identities of the remaining four members. He chases Sartain to the rooftop where Sartain tries to flee in a hover car, but Ryan opens fire on the vehicle, destroying it. After another trip to the Dreamweb, he arrives at the destroyed house of Julliet Chappel, another of the evils. Believing she died, Ryan picks up a half-burnt cartridge and returns home, where from reading its contents he discovers the location of her church.

Unable to get inside the church, he pursues Diane Underwood, who is in a heavily guarded beach house. Upon inspecting the surroundings of the house, Ryan finds the control box of the security system, and douses it in water, blowing up the turret which releases heavy bolts of energy inside the house. Entering by the huge hole in the wall, Ryan finds Underwood chopped in half, but still alive. After learning more about the "Project 7", Ryan kills the suffering woman. Back in the Dreamweb, he learns the remaining two evil are growing more powerful with each successive death of the members.

Arriving at the church and making his way into its secret underground passages, he finds the deceased, deformed body of Father O' Rourke, which leaves only one living member: Dr. Beckett. Ryan finds him in the subway, linked to the church's undergrounds. As Beckett tracks Ryan, he is run over by a train. Ryan returns to the Dreamweb, where he is thanked by the master monk, but also learns his fate. He returns to the real world for the last time, where he is shot dead by the police for his numerous crimes. Ryan's last vision is of his soul entering the Dreamweb.

Development
The biggest influence for the game was the 1986 film Highlander. The developers applied the concept of seven deadly sins to the game in the form of Ryan's victims. The ending to the booklet Diary of a (Mad?) man was intentionally left ambiguous. Dialog trees were never considered to be part of the game because David Dew did not particularly like the mechanic. In 1995, DreamWeb was refused classification in Australia, due to a rock star showing his penis in the game. Underpants were added to the rock star and the game was resubmitted in the same year for an M rating.

Reception

The game was reviewed in 1995 in Dragon #215 by Jay & Dee in the "Eye of the Monitor" column. Both reviewers gave the game 1½ out of 5 stars.

DreamWeb also received negative 2000s reviews from Austin Boosinger of Adventure Gamers (1½ out of 5 stars), David Tanguay of Adventure Classic Gaming (2 out of 5 stars) and Rosemary Young of the now defunct Quandaryland website (1 out of 5 stars).

Positive reviews were given by Tapio Salminen of the Finnish video games magazine Pelit (91 out of 100), Jamie Davies of the now defunct NTSC-uk website (7 out of 10), the French gaming website JeuxVideo (15 out of 20) and the video games magazine Power Play (85% out of 100%). Will Groves reviewed the game for PC Gamer'', and while praising the "atmospheric gameworld" he noted that the game felt "irretrievably old fashioned" concluding that while it was not a bad game it was a style of title that had been done many times before and offered nothing novel.

References

External links
Free download of the game at ScummVM
DreamWeb review at NTSC-uk
DreamWeb review & screenshots at Adventure Classic Gaming

UnExoticA music files page

1994 video games
Adventure games
Amiga games
Amiga 1200 games
Cyberpunk video games
DOS games
Freeware games
ScummVM-supported games
Point-and-click adventure games
Top-down video games
Video games about dreams
Video games developed in the United Kingdom
Single-player video games
Empire Interactive games